Turkiewicz is a Polish surname, a patronymic form of the English surname Turk. Notable people with the surname include:

Jim Turkiewicz (born 1955), ice hockey player
Michał Turkiewicz (1956–2021), Polish politician
Sophia Turkiewicz, Australian film and television director

References

Polish-language surnames